Konrad Waldemar Dobler (born 27 April 1957 in Alt-Asbach, Rotthalmünster, Lower Bavaria) is a former long-distance runner from Germany, who twice represented his native country at the Summer Olympics: 1992 and 1996. He set his personal best (2:11:57) in the men's marathon in 1991.

Dobler is a policeman by occupation. He was mayor of Langerringen in Swabia between 2002 and 2020.

Achievements
All results regarding marathon, unless stated otherwise

References

1957 births
Living people
People from Passau (district)
Sportspeople from Lower Bavaria
German male long-distance runners
German male marathon runners
Athletes (track and field) at the 1992 Summer Olympics
Athletes (track and field) at the 1996 Summer Olympics
Olympic athletes of Germany
Frankfurt Marathon male winners
Mayors of places in Germany
20th-century German people